John Waters (born 1946) is an American film director, writer, visual artist, actor and cult figure.

John Waters may also refer to:

Entertainment
John Waters (director born 1893) (1893–1965), American film director, active 1926–1929 and 1947
John Waters (actor) (born 1948), English-born Australian actor, musician and singer

Military
Sir John Waters (British Army officer, born 1774) (1774–1842), officer in the British Army during the Napoleonic Wars
John K. Waters (1906–1989), American general
Sir John Waters (British Army officer, born 1935), British Army general

Others
John Waters (columnist) (born 1955), Irish journalist
John Waters (politician) (1829–1910), Canadian Liberal legislator

See also
Sir John Kirwan (politician) (John Waters Kirwan, 1869–1949), English-born Australian legislator 
Waters (name)
John Watters (disambiguation)
John Walters (disambiguation)
John Walter (disambiguation)
Jon Waters (born 1976), American marching band director